Çamoluk can refer to:

 Çamoluk
 Çamoluk, Kaynaşlı
 Çamoluk, Sungurlu